The Order of the State of Republic of Turkey is the highest state order awarded to foreign nationals by the President of the Republic of Turkey.

The Order of the State is conferred by the President, upon the decision of the Council of Ministers, to the Heads of State, presidents and royal members in recognition of their contributions for enhancing the amicable relations between their respective countries and Turkey. The "Regulation on State Awards and Medals" numbered 19892 was prepared and entered in the Official Gazette on 7 August 1988.

Characteristics 
Order of the Republic of Turkey has a diameter of 8.9 cm. Composed of gold and silver, there is 18 carat green gold in the hexagonal center, crescent and star white enamel on a red background, and a pencil application on six crescents around it. There are a total of seven swords, four long and three short, with white and red metal applications from the middle of the crescents and six white and red star enamels at the ends of these swords. 18-carat green gold is used in the stars. The badge is a horizontal rectangle and measures 3.40 x 1.67 cm.  There are 925 sterling silver frame pen application around it, Turkish flag motif on the ground, crescent and star enamel rhodium plating method in white and red colors in the middle. The order consists of 61.5 g (925 sterling silver) and 5.4 g (750 mil gold). The rosette is 7.15 gr (925 sterling silver).

On 5 November 2013, with the regulation issued by the Justice and Development Party and approved by the President Abdullah Gül and published in the Official Gazette, the Mustafa Kemal Atatürk silhouette on the front of the state badge and the caption of "Turkish Republic Order of the State" on the back were removed. Public Workers Unions Confederation of Turkey (Kamu-Sen) sued the State Council at the request of a stay of implementation and cancellation. In October 2016, the Council of State gave the cancellation of the missing regulation part of the state medal decision in the 6th article of the State Medals and Insignia Regulation, without including the "Atatürk Relief". The Prime Ministry appealed the decision. On October 10, 2018, a higher court of the Council of State, the Board of Trial Chambers, “emphasizing that Atatürk is the immortal leader”, approved the decision of the lower court by majority vote and canceled the regulated part.

Ceremony 
The Order of the State is given to the winner together with the certificate and badge by the President of Turkey or a person appointed by the President at a ceremony. Otherwise, if he has not been left to one of the heirs;  it’s given to the boys starting from the eldest, otherwise to his daughters, to his father if he has no children, to his mother if he has no father, to his spouse if there is no mother. The absence of his spouse is transferred to his legal heirs in accordance with the provisions of the Turkish Civil Code.

The ceremony is according to a certain protocol and procedures. The ceremony starts with the National Anthem of Turkey and then decision regarding the aiming parties is read. The person who will present the award goes in front of the people who will attach them on, gives their badges and certificates and congratulates themselves. Award recipients stand at intervals from the right, separately for each medal and decoration group. The order of the groups is arranged according to the priority order of the awards or medal in the law, the priority of the persons according to the state protocol for the public officials and the surname for the private persons.

Statistics 

The order was first given to the second president of Poland Lech Wałęsa, by the 9th President Süleyman Demirel in 1994. Demirel awarded the head of state and president of 12 countries during his tenure. During the tenure of the next President Ahmet Necdet Sezer, only the first president of the Czech Republic Václav Havel was given the order. No order was given between 2001-2006. After the 11th President Abdullah Gül took office, the state order was given for the first time to King Harald V of Norway. The King Philippe I of Belgium, Salman bin Abdulaziz, King of Saudi Arabia, Emir of Kuwait Sabah al-Ahmad al-Jabir al-Sabah and Tunisian President Beji Caid Essebsi were awarded by Recep Tayyip Erdoğan who took office on 28 August 2014. Azerbaijan, Poland and Saudi Arabia received the highest order with two awards each, and, in total, 29 people were awarded the Order of the state.

Recipients of the Order of State

References

External links

Civil awards and decorations of Turkey
Awards established in 1983